Giuseppe Patroni Griffi (26 February 1921 – 15 December 2005) was an Italian playwright, screenwriter, director and author.

He was born in Naples in an aristocratic family and moved to Rome immediately after the end of World War II and spent his professional life there. Patroni Griffi is considered one of the most prominent contributors to Italian theater and film in post-war Italy.
 
Roberto Rossellini made a film from his play .

His first listed film writing credit was on the 1952 musical Canzoni di mezzo secolo. Patroni Griffi would later direct Charlotte Rampling, Elizabeth Taylor, Marcello Mastroianni, Laura Antonelli, Florinda Bolkan, Terence Stamp, Fabio Testi.

Patroni Griffi was also involved with numerous television productions of lyric opera, including Verdi's La Traviata. His many theatrical productions include works by Pirandello, Eduardo De Filippo, Jean Cocteau and Tennessee Williams. As a writer, he published a first collection of stories in 1955, Ragazzo di Trastevere. Later, he contributed significantly to the body of Italian gay literature with Scende giù per Toledo and La morte della bellezza, both set in Naples.

He died in Rome.

Selected filmography 

As a director, he is most noted for:
 Il Mare (1962)
 Metti una sera a cena (1969)
 Addio, fratello crudele (1971, film adaptation of 'Tis Pity She's a Whore with Charlotte Rampling and Oliver Tobias)
 Identikit (1974) with Elizabeth Taylor
 The Divine Nymph (1975)
 La gabbia (1985)
 La romana (1988)
 Tosca (1992)
 La traviata (2000)

References

External links 
 Films of Giuseppe Patroni Griffi
 

1921 births
2005 deaths
Italian film directors
Italian theatre directors
Writers from Naples
Italian male dramatists and playwrights
20th-century Italian male writers
20th-century Italian dramatists and playwrights
Theatre people from Naples
Film people from Naples